Leuschnerdamm is a street in Kreuzberg, Berlin, Germany.

See also
 Bust of Carl Legien
 Bust of Wilhelm Leuschner

External links
 

Friedrichshain-Kreuzberg
Streets in Berlin